The Penny W. Stamps School of Art and Design is the school of art and design of the University of Michigan located in Ann Arbor, Michigan. The school offers graduate and undergraduate degrees in art and design.

Established as an independent unit in 1974, A&D is one of 19 schools and colleges at the University of Michigan. It is fully accredited by the National Association of Schools of Art and Design. The Stamps School of Art & Design's academic programs and projects focus on generating new creative work, integrating the cultures of art and design, and engaging with the University, region, and national and international communities. In 2012, it was named for Penny and E. Roe Stamps in honor of their longtime support of the school, which included a $32.5 million gift in September 2012.

Pre-College Programs
The Stamps Pre-College programs were established in 2008. The Stamps School of Art & Design offers Spring Studio classes and Summer Studio sessions. Virtual and in-person programs are offered to current high school students (grades 9 – 12) interested in building new skills for their creative pursuits. Students receive personalized training and advice from Stamps faculty and staff on building a competitive portfolio.

Pre-College scholarships are available to select students who have been accepted into the program. A limited number of full and partial awards are provided to students who demonstrate need and merit. Michigan residents applying for summer sessions may also apply for the Watson A. Young Scholarship, an initiative supported by the University of Michigan’s Center for Educational Outreach. The Watson A Young scholarship was established to support middle and high school students’ participation in summer opportunities at the University of Michigan that seek to develop students’ interests and abilities in academic disciplines and expose students to the experiences and possibilities provided by higher education.

Faculty and Staff
The Penny W. Stamps School of Art & Design employs over 40 full-time faculty. Fifteen of the full-time faculty hold dual appointments in the School and another discipline at the University. Another 15 faculty, based in University disciplines outside of Art & Design, are jointly appointed in the School. David Chung (artist) serves as the director for the MFA program. Four of the School's current professors, Phoebe Gloeckner, and Holly Hughes, Heidi Kumao, Endi E. Poskovic are recipients of the Guggenheim Fellowship. In 2010, Associate Professor Rebekah Modrak published Reframing Photography, a pioneering textbook in photographic education. In 2011, Associate Professor Matt Kenyon's work, Notepad, was acquired by the Museum of Modern Art. 40 other administrative and technical staff support the School's programs.

Exhibitions
The Penny W. Stamps School of Art & Design maintains two galleries for the presentation of creative work by students, faculty, staff, and the larger community of artists/designers, as well as PLAY, an online gallery space devoted to time-based work.

Lectures and Visitors Program
The Penny W. Stamps School of Art & Design offers two visitors programs  – the Penny Stamps Distinguished Speakers Series and the Roman J. Witt Visitors Program.  Both are funded by Penny W. and E. Roe Stamps.  The Penny W. Stamps Distinguished Visitors Series brings emerging and established artists/designers from a broad spectrum of media to the School to conduct a public lecture and engage with students, faculty, and the larger University and Ann Arbor communities.  Recent visiting artists and lecturers have included Anna Sui, Oliver Stone, Sally Mann, Janine Antoni, Stefan Sagmeister, Ernesto Neto, Maira Kalman, Daniel Handler, Philip Glass, Robert Wilson, Cory Doctorow, Temple Grandin, Matthew Ritchie, Michael Moore, Paula Scher, Bob Mankoff, Marina Abramović, Theo Jansen, Sir Ken Robinson, Cheech Marin, Trimpin, Chip Kidd, Mariko Mori, Peter Chung, Wangechi Mutu, Natasha Tsakos, Laurie Anderson, DJ Spooky, and Pussy Riot.  The Distinguished Visitors Series takes place at the historic Michigan Theater in downtown Ann Arbor.

Facilities
The Penny W. Stamps School of Art & Design maintains several facilities devoted to the practice of creative work. The main facility is located on North Campus, within the University of Michigan's 70,000 sq ft. Art and Architecture Building, which is shared with the Taubman College of Architecture and Urban Planning. North Campus is also home to the School of Music, Theater & Dance, the College of Engineering, the Duderstadt Center, Pierpont Commons, and Maya Lin's Wave Field. The main facility includes studios in clay, electromechanical work, fibers, hot and cold metals, painting, drawing, physical computing, print media (digital/hand/photographic), sculpture, video and wood. Individual undergraduate studios in the main facility are assigned to all seniors in the BFA program, while full-time faculty members and graduate students are provided with individual studios in off-site buildings.

References

University of Michigan schools, colleges, and departments
Art schools in Michigan
1974 establishments in Michigan
Tourist attractions in Ann Arbor, Michigan
University of Michigan campus
Educational institutions established in 1974

de:University of Michigan
fr:Université du Michigan
io:Universitato di Michigan
ms:University of Michigan
nl:Universiteit van Michigan
ja:ミシガン大学
fi:Michiganin yliopisto
sv:University of Michigan
th:มหาวิทยาลัยมิชิแกน
zh:密歇根大学